Overbrook station is a SEPTA Regional Rail station on the Paoli/Thorndale Line, located near 63rd Street and City Line Avenue (US 1) in the Overbrook neighborhood of Philadelphia, Pennsylvania. It serves many of the residents of Overbrook Farms and the suburban neighborhoods across City Avenue in neighboring Montgomery County, as well as Saint Joseph's University and Talmudical Yeshiva of Philadelphia. In 2017, the average total weekday SEPTA boardings at this station was 774 and the average total weekday SEPTA alightings was 717.

History

The current station building was constructed around 1860 on the inbound (eastbound) side. The station, platforms, and canopies were restored from 1999 to 2003 in a $9.1 million project. A smaller shelter serves westbound passengers.

Amtrak served Overbrook with some westbound Keystone Service trips until 1987.

Station layout
Overbrook has two low-level side platforms with pathways connecting the platforms to the inner tracks.

References

External links

SEPTA - Overbrook Station
Station from Google Maps Street View

SEPTA Regional Rail stations
Former Pennsylvania Railroad stations
Philadelphia to Harrisburg Main Line
Railway stations in the United States opened in 1860
Former Amtrak stations in Pennsylvania
Overbrook, Philadelphia
Railway stations in Pennsylvania at university and college campuses